Articles (arranged alphabetically) related to Madagascar include:



A 
 Alaotra Mangoro Region
 Albert Camille Vital
 Albert Zafy
 Ambatovaky Special Reserve
 Amber Forest Reserve
 Amber Mountain National Park
 Ambohijanahary Special Reserve
 Ambohimanga
 Ambohitantely Special Reserve
 Amoron'i Mania Region
 Analamanga Region
 Analamazoatra Reserve
 Analamerana Special Reserve
 Analanjirofo Region
 Andafiavaratra Palace
 Andasibe-Mantadia National Park
 Andohahela National Park
 Andranomena Special Reserve
 Andriamanelo
 Andriamasinavalona
 Andriambelomasina
 Andriana
 Andrianampoinimerina
 Andrianerinerina
 Andrianjaka
 Andrianjaka Razakatsitakatrandriana
 Andrianjafy
 Andriantsimitoviaminiandriana Andriandrazaka
 Andriantsimitoviaminandriandehibe
 Andriantsitakatrandriana
 Andringitra National Park
 Andry Rajoelina
 Androy Region
 Anjajavy Forest
 Anjanaharibe-Sud Reserve
 Ankarafantsika National Park
 Ankarana Special Reserve
 Ankeniheny-Zahamena Corridor
 Ankify
 Anosy Region
 Antaifasy
 Antaimoro
 Antaisaka
 Antambahoaka
 Antandroy
 Antankarana
 Antambahoaka
 Antananarivo
 Antananarivo Province
 Antananarivo–Toamasina toll highway
 Antankarana
 Antanosy
 Antongil Bay
 Antsiranana
 Antsiranana Bay
 Antsiranana Province
 Aquaculture in Madagascar
 Architecture of Madagascar
 Armand Léon Annet
 Association for the Rebirth of Madagascar
 Atsimo Andrefana Region
 Atsimo Atsinanana Region
 Atsinanana Region
 Aye-aye

B 
 Baie de Baly National Park
 Bara people
 Battle of Madagascar
 Beza Mahafaly Reserve
 Bemarivo Reserve
 Bemarivo River
 Bemolanga
 Berenty Reserve
 Betampona Reserve
 Betsiboka Region
 Betsiboka River
 Betsileo
 Betsimisaraka people
 Beza Mahafaly Reserve
 Bezanozano
Bezora
 Boeny Region
 Bombetoka Bay
 Bongolava Region
 Bora Reserve
 Brun-Ly

C 
 Cape Saint Marie
 Cécile Manorohanta
 Charles Le Myre de Vilers
 Charles Rabemananjara
 Charlotte Arisoa Rafenomanjato
 Chinese people in Madagascar
 Climate change in Madagascar
 Coal companies of Madagascar
 Coins of Madagascar
 Comazar
 Communications in Madagascar
 Constituencies of Madagascar
 Constitution of Madagascar
 Cuisine of Madagascar
 Culture of Madagascar

D 
 Daniel Rajakoba
 Deforestation in Madagascar
 Désiré Rakotoarijaona
 Diana Region
 Didier Ratsiraka
 Diplomatic missions of Madagascar
 Driving in Madagascar

E 
 Economic Liberalism and Democratic Action for National Recovery
 Economy of Madagascar
 Education in Madagascar
 Efoetsy
 Elections in Madagascar
 Elia Ravelomanantsoa
 Emmanuel Rakotovahiny
 Ethnic groups of Madagascar
 Eugène Mangalaza

F 
 Fampandrosoana Mirindra
 Fandroana
 Fanjava Velogno
 Fanorona
 Fihavanantsika
 First Madagascar expedition
 Fianarantsoa Province
 Foreign relations of Madagascar
 Francisque Ravony
 Franco-Hova War
 French people in Madagascar

G 
 Gabriel Ramanantsoa
 Geography of Madagascar
 Geology of Madagascar
 Gilles Andriamahazo
 Guy Razanamasy

H 
 Hainteny
 Haute-Matsiatra Region
 Herilanto Raveloharison
 Herizo Razafimahaleo
 High Transitional Authority
 Hiragasy
 History of Madagascar
 Human rights in Madagascar

I 
 Iavoloha Palace
 Ibonia
 Ihorombe Region
 Ihosy River
 Ikopa River
 Île aux Nattes
 Île Sainte-Marie
 Illegal logging in Madagascar
 Indian Ocean
 Indians in Madagascar
 Isalo National Park
 Isandra Mivoatsa
 Itasy Region
 Pic d'Ivohibe Reserve

J 
 Jacques Sylla
 James Cameron (missionary)
 Jaojoby
 Jean Joseph Rabearivelo
 Jean Lahiniriko
 Joseph-François Lambert
 Joseph Galliéni
 Jules Marcel de Coppet
 Judged By Your Work Party
 Justin Rakotoniaina

K 
 Kalambatritra Reserve
 Kasijy Reserve
 Kingdom of Madagascar
 Kirindy Mitea National Park

L 
 Lake Alaotra
 Lake Ihotry
 Lake Itasy
 Lake Kinkony
 Lake Tritriva
 Lake Tsimanampetsotsa
 Lamba
 Lavaka
 Lemur
 LGBT rights in Madagascar (Gay rights)
 Liaraike
 List of cities in Madagascar
 List of Malagasy monarchs
 List of national parks of Madagascar
 List of political parties in Madagascar
 List of World Heritage Sites in Madagascar
 Lokobe Reserve
 Les Moulins de Madagascar Farine SA

M 
 Madagascar
 Madagascar (disambiguation)
 Madagascar dry deciduous forests
 Madagascar ericoid thickets
 Madagascar for the Malagasy
 Madagascar lowland forests
 Madagascar mangroves
 Madagascar spiny thickets
 Madagascar succulent woodlands
 Madagascar subhumid forests
 Madanet
 Madarail
 Maevatandria
 Mahafaly
 Mahajanga
 Mahajanga Province
 Mahalaza-Fanimana
 Mahavavy-Kinkony
 Makira Natural Park
 Makoa
 Malagasy cuisine
 Malagasy general election, 2011
 Malagasy language
 Malagasy mythology
 Malagasy people
 Malagasy parliamentary election, 2007
 Malagasy presidential election, 2001
 Malagasy presidential election, 2006
 Manandafy Rakotonirina
 Mananjary River
 Mandraka Falls
 Mangerivola Special Reserve
 Mangoky River
 Mania River
 Maningoza Special Reserve
 Manombo Special Reserve
 Manongarivo Special Reserve
 Marc Ravalomanana
 Marojejy National Park
 Maromokotro
 Marotandrano Special Reserve
 Masoala National Park
 Maurice Bompard
 Mauritius
 Mayors' Association
 Melaky Region
 Menabe Region
 Menabe Reserve
 Menalamba rebellion
 Merina
 Michèle Rakotoson
 Midongy du sud National Park
 Mikea
 Mikea Forest
 Mikea National Park
 Military of Madagascar
 Mining industry of Madagascar
 Monja Roindefo
 Montagne des Français
 Morondava Basin
 Mount Ambohitra
 Movement for the Progress of Madagascar
 Mozambique Channel
 Music of Madagascar

N 
 National Assembly of Madagascar
 National Union (Madagascar)
 National Union for Democracy and Development
 National Wisa Association
 Nicolas Vatomanga
 Norbert Ratsirahonana
 Nosy Be
 Nosy Mangabe
 Ny Hasina Andriamanjato

O 
 Onilahy River
 Our Madagascar

P 
 Pascal Rakotomavo
 Paul Louis Victor Marie Legentilhomme
 Penguins of Madagascar
 Pety Rakotoniaina
 Philibert Tsiranana
 Politics of Madagascar
 President of Madagascar
 President of Madagascar's Small Grants Scheme
 Prime Minister of Madagascar
 Provinces of Madagascar

R 
 Ramaniraka
 Ramsar sites in Madagascar
 Ranomafana National Park
 Rebirth of the Social Democratic Party
 Regions of Madagascar
 Radama I
 Radama II
 Rafohy
 Rainiharo
 Rainilaiarivony
 Rainivoninahitriniony
 Ralambo
 Ranavalona I
 Ranavalona II
 Ranavalona III
 Rangita
 Rasoherina
 Raymond Razafimbahiny
 Richard Ratsimandrava
 Robert Grice Sturges
 Roland Ratsiraka
 Rova of Antananarivo

S 
 Salman Khan
 Sakalava
 Sambirano
 Samifin
 Sampy
 Sava Region
 Second Madagascar expedition
 Senate of Madagascar
 Sihanaka
 Social Democratic Party of Madagascar and the Comoros
 Sofia Region
 Seychelles

T 
 Tampoketsa Analamaitso Reserve
 Tanala
 Tantely Andrianarivo
 Taralily
 Telecommunications in Madagascar
 Tiako I Madagasikara
 Toamasina Province
 Toliara Province
 Tourism in Madagascar
 Transport in Madagascar
 Tsarabanjina
 Tsaratanana Reserve
 Tsimanampetsotsa National Park
 Tsimihety
 Tsimiroro
 Tsingy de Bemaraha National Park
 Tsingy de Bemaraha Strict Nature Reserve
 Tsingy de Namoroka Strict Nature Reserve
 Twelve sacred hills of Imerina

U 
 Union (Madagascar)

V 
 Vakinankaratra Region
 Valiha
 Vanguard of the Malagasy Revolution
 Vanilla
 Vaovao
 Vatovavy-Fitovinany Region
 Vazimba
 Vezo
 Victor Ramahatra
 Vohibato Tapa-kevitsa

W

X

Y 
 Young Malagasies Determined

Z 
 Zafimaniry
 Zafisoro
 Zahamena National Park
 Zahamena Reserve
 Zebu
 Zombitse-Vohibasia National Park

See also

Lists of country-related topics - similar lists for other countries

 
Madagascar